Alumbramento is the third album by Brazilian singer and composer Djavan. The album features some of his greatest hits, like "Meu Bem Querer", "Lambada de Serpente" e "Tem Boi Na Linha".
The album begins a career of Djavan partnerships with other composers, the following partnerships rarely work in the following.

Track listing
Side one

Side two

References

Djavan albums
1980 albums